Saint Olav's Church is a medieval church in the village of Kirkjubøur in Streymoy, Faroe Islands. It was built before 1200, which makes it the oldest church of the Faroe Islands. Until the Reformation, it served as the seat of the Catholic bishop.

A runestone, the Kirkjubøur stone, was found in 1832 in the church. Today it is in the National Museum of the Faroe Islands.
The pew ends from the church were transferred in 1875, after the church was restored, to the National Museum of Denmark in Copenhagen and were returned to Faroe Islands and exhibited at the National Museum of the Faroe Islands in 2002. 
There are 14 pew ends, 11 depicting the Apostles, and the three remaining ones depicting other Biblical figures. They were on several occasions featured on postal stamps — in 1980 (4 stamps), in 1984 (4 stamps), and in 2001 (4 stamps).

References

External links
Ólavskirkjan (Folkakirkjan)

Christianity in the Faroe Islands
Churches in the Faroe Islands
Kirkjubøur